Som (Somm) is one of the Finisterre languages of Papua New Guinea.

References

Definitely endangered languages
Finisterre languages
Languages of Morobe Province